Roger Fauroux (21 November 1926 – 16 July 2021) was a French politician and civil servant who served as Minister of Industry and Regional Planning from 1988 to 1991.

Fauroux was born in Montpellier, France.

References

1926 births
2021 deaths
French civil servants
20th-century French politicians
Government ministers of France
Lycée Henri-IV alumni
École Normale Supérieure alumni
École nationale d'administration alumni
Inspection générale des finances (France)
Mayors of places in Occitania (administrative region)
Politicians from Montpellier
Grand Croix of the Légion d'honneur
French chief executives